The 2018 Canadian Beef Masters was held from October 23 to 28, at the Rath Eastlink Arena in Truro, Nova Scotia. This was be the second Grand Slam and first major of the 2018–19 curling season.

On the men's side, John Epping defeated Kevin Koe 7–4 in the final, completing a career Grand Slam for Epping, winning all four major events. On the women's side, Anna Hasselborg defeated Rachel Homan 8–7 to win their second straight Grand Slam.

Qualification
The top 14 men's and women's teams on the World Curling Tour order of merit standing as of September 20, 2018 qualified for the event. The Grand Slam of Curling may fill one spot in each division as a sponsor's exemption. In the event that a team declines its invitation, the next-ranked team on the order of merit is invited until the field is complete.

Men
Top Order of Merit men's teams as of September 20:
 Niklas Edin
 Brad Gushue
 Kevin Koe
 Bruce Mouat
 Jason Gunnlaugson
 John Epping
 Brad Jacobs
 Peter de Cruz
 Reid Carruthers
 Steffen Walstad
 Brendan Bottcher
 Glenn Howard
 John Shuster
 Thomas Ulsrud
 Rich Ruohonen
 Ross Paterson
 Yannick Schwaller
 Matt Dunstone

Sponsor's exemption:
 Jamie Murphy

Women
Top Order of Merit women's teams as of September 20:
 Anna Hasselborg
 Jennifer Jones
 Rachel Homan
 Tracy Fleury
 Eve Muirhead
 Jamie Sinclair
 Laura Walker
 Nina Roth
 Kim Eun-jung
 Satsuki Fujisawa
 Kerri Einarson
 Silvana Tirinzoni
 Darcy Robertson
 Casey Scheidegger
 Chelsea Carey

Sponsor's exemption:
 Kaitlyn Jones

Men

Teams

Round-robin standings

Round-robin results
All draw times are listed in Atlantic Daylight time (UTC-3).

Draw 1
Tuesday, October 23, 7:00 pm

Draw 2
Wednesday, October 24, 8:00 am

Draw 3
Wednesday, October 24, 11:30 am

Draw 4
Wednesday, October 24, 3:30 pm

Draw 5
Wednesday, October 24, 7:30 pm

Draw 6
Thursday, October 25, 8:00 am

Draw 7
Thursday, October 25, 11:30 am

Draw 8
Thursday, October 25, 3:30 pm

Draw 9
Thursday, October 25, 7:30 pm

Draw 10
Friday, October 26, 8:00 am

Draw 11
Friday, October 26, 11:30 am

Draw 12
Friday, October 26, 3:30 pm

Draw 13
Friday, October 26, 8:00 pm

Tiebreakers

Saturday, October 27, 8:00 am

Saturday, October 27, 11:30 am

Playoffs

Quarterfinals
Saturday, October 27, 11:30 am

Saturday, October 27, 4:00 pm

Semifinals
Sunday, October 28, 10:00 am

Final
Sunday, October 28, 2:00 pm

Women

Teams

Round-robin standings

Round-robin results
All draw times are listed in Atlantic Daylight time (UTC-3).

Draw 1
Tuesday, October 23, 7:00 pm

Draw 2
Wednesday, October 24, 8:00 am

Draw 3
Wednesday, October 24, 11:30 am

Draw 4
Wednesday, October 24, 3:30 pm

Draw 5
Wednesday, October 24, 7:30 pm

Draw 6
Thursday, October 25, 8:00 am

Draw 7
Thursday, October 25, 11:30 am

Draw 8
Thursday, October 25, 3:30 pm

Draw 9
Thursday, October 25, 7:30 pm

Draw 10
Friday, October 26, 8:00 am

Draw 11
Friday, October 26, 11:30 pm

Draw 12
Friday, October 26, 3:30 pm

Tiebreakers
Friday, October 26, 8:00 pm

Saturday, October 27, 8:00 am

Playoffs

Quarterfinals
Saturday, October 27, 4:00 pm

Semifinals
Sunday, October 28, 10:00 am

Final
Sunday, October 28, 6:00 pm

References

External links

October 2018 sports events in Canada
2018 in Canadian curling
Truro, Nova Scotia
Curling in Nova Scotia
2018 in Nova Scotia
2018